Alfred Edward Clarke (6 April 1868 – 16 September 1940) was a cricketer. He played first-class cricket for New South Wales in Australia from 1890 to 1892 and for Otago and Wellington in New Zealand from 1894 to 1901.

Clarke was born in Sydney in Australia in 1868. After moving to New Zealand he played for the national team in the 1890s, before it was granted Test status. He also umpired a first-class match in New Zealand. He died at Wellington in 1940.

References

External links
 

1868 births
1940 deaths
Australian cricketers
New South Wales cricketers
Otago cricketers
Pre-1930 New Zealand representative cricketers
Wellington cricketers
Cricketers from Sydney